Acrotaenia spadix is a species of tephritid or fruit flies in the genus Acrotaenia of the family Tephritidae.

Distribution
Cuba, Haiti, Dominican Republic.

References

Tephritinae
Insects described in 1934
Diptera of North America